Maruco Antônio Urunau (born November 16, 1970), known as just Antônio, is a former Brazilian football player.

Playing career
In 2000, Antônio joined Japanese J2 League club Ventforet Kofu which finished at the bottom place in 1999 season. However he could not play many matches and Ventforet finished at the bottom place for 2 years in a row.

Club statistics

References

External links

1970 births
Living people
Brazilian footballers
Maccabi Herzliya F.C. players
Ventforet Kofu players
Liga Leumit players
J2 League players
Brazilian expatriate footballers
Expatriate footballers in Japan
Expatriate footballers in Israel
Brazilian expatriate sportspeople in Japan
Brazilian expatriate sportspeople in Israel
Association football midfielders